The Norwegian Police Service is divided into 27 police districts, which collectively cover Metropolitan Norway.

Current structure
The following is a list of police districts in Norway. It lists the head office location, the chief of police, the number of employees (2011), the number of rural and location stations, the population the district covers and the area it covers, including important non-Schengen Area borders.

Former structure
The following is a list of police districts prior to the 2002 reform. The list further contains 1999 data regarding the population, number of employees, criminal cases and budget in million Norwegian krone. The list also includes former police stations (politikamre).

References

Law enforcement in Norway
1894 establishments in Norway